José de Jesús Barrero Andrade (July 26, 1958 – February 17, 2016), better known by his stage name Jesús Barrero, was a Mexican actor and voice actor.

Biography
Barrero began his acting career in 1968 at the age of nine playing secondary roles in theater and voice-over work. He made his debut in a leading role four years later with the Latin American Spanish dub of the PBS series Big Blue Marble. Barrero was best known for his roles as the voice of Pegasus Seiya in Saint Seiya, Rick Hunter and Scott Bernard in Robotech, Koji Kabuto in Mazinger Z, Kuzco in The Emperor's New Groove, Jason Lee Scott in Mighty Morphin' Power Rangers, Koji Minamoto in Digimon Frontier, Rex in the Toy Story series, Luke Skywalker in the Star Wars saga and Yoichi Hiruma in Eyeshield 21.

Barrero was diagnosed with lung cancer in March 2015 and died from the disease on February 17, 2016, at the age of 57. His last film role was in Star Wars: The Force Awakens as the voice of Luke Skywalker.

Filmography

Animation

Feature films

References

External links 
 
 
 

1958 births
2016 deaths
Mexican male voice actors
Mexican male television actors
20th-century Mexican male actors
21st-century Mexican male actors
Mexican voice directors
Male actors from Mexico City
Deaths from lung cancer in Mexico